ConTeXt is a general-purpose document processor. Like LaTeX, it is derived from TeX. It is especially suited for structured documents, automated document production, very fine typography, and multi-lingual typesetting. It is based in part on the TeX typesetting system, and uses a document markup language for manuscript preparation.  The typographical and automated capabilities of ConTeXt are extensive, including interfaces for handling microtypography, multiple footnotes and footnote classes, and manipulating OpenType fonts and features. Moreover, it offers extensive support for colors, backgrounds, hyperlinks, presentations, figure-text integration, and conditional compilation. It gives the user extensive control over formatting while making it easy to create new layouts and styles without learning the low-level TeX macro language.

ConTeXt may be compared and contrasted with LaTeX, but the primary thrust of the two are rather distinct. ConTeXt from the ground up is a typography and typesetting system meant to provide users easy and consistent access to advanced typographical control—important for general-purpose typesetting tasks. The original vision of LaTeX is to insulate the user from typographical decisions—a useful approach for submitting e.g. articles for a scientific journal. LaTeX has evolved from that original vision; at the same time, ConTeXt's unified design avoids the package clashes that can happen with LaTeX.

ConTeXt provides a multi-lingual user interface with support for markup in English, Dutch, German, French, and Italian and support for output in many languages including western European, eastern European, Arabic-script, Chinese, Japanese, and Korean. It also allows the user to use different TeX engines like pdfTeX, XeTeX, and LuaTeX without changing the user interface.

As its native drawing engine, ConTeXt integrates a superset of MetaPost called MetaFun, which allows the users to use the drawing abilities of MetaPost for page backgrounds and ornaments. Metafun can also be used with stand alone MetaPost. ConTeXt also supports the use of other external drawing engines, like PGF/TikZ and PSTricks.

ConTeXt also provides a macro package for typesetting chemical structure diagrams with TeX called PPCHTeX, as well as many other modules. This package can also be used with plain TeX and LaTeX.

Originally entitled pragmatex, ConTeXt was given its name around 1996 by Hans Hagen from PRAGMA Advanced Document Engineering (Pragma ADE), a Netherlands-based company.

License 

ConTeXt is free software: the program code (i.e. anything not under the /doc subtree) is distributed under the GNU GPL; the documentation is provided under Creative Commons Attribution NonCommercial ShareAlike license.

The ConTeXt official manual(2001) and ConTeXt official mini tutorial (1999) are documents copyrighted by Pragma, but there is a repository of the future new manual released under the GNU Free Documentation License. As of April 2009 there is an up-to-date version of the fonts and typography chapters.

Versions 

The current version of ConTeXt is LMTX, introduced in April 2019 as the successor to Mark IV (MkIV). Previous versions — Mark II (MkII) and Mark I — are no longer maintained.

According to the developers, the principal difference between LMTX and its predecessors is that the newest version "uses a compilation and scripting engine that is specifically developed with ConTeXt in mind: LuaMetaTeX ... [which] has been optimised heavily for ConTeXt use." Previously, MkIV used LuaTeX and MkII used pdfTeX.

History 
ConTeXt was created by Hans Hagen and Ton Otten of Pragma ADE in the Netherlands around 1991 due to the need for educational typesetting material.

Around 1996, Hans Hagen coined the name ConTeXt meaning "text with tex" (con-tex-t; "con" is a Latin preposition meaning "together with"). Before 1996 ConTeXt was used only within Pragma ADE, but in 1996 it began to be adopted by a wider audience. The first users outside Pragma were Taco Hoekwater, Berend de Boer and Gilbert van den Dobbelsteen, and the first user outside the Netherlands was Tobias Burnus.

In July 2004, contextgarden.net wiki page was created.

ConTeXt low-level code was originally written in Dutch. Around 2005, the ConTeXt developers began translating this to English, resulting in the version known as MKII, which is now stable and frozen.

In August 2007, Hans Hagen presented the MKIV version, and the first public beta was released later that year.

During the ConTeXt User Meeting 2008, Mojca Miklavec presented ConTeXt Minimals, a distribution of ConTeXt containing the latest binaries and intended to have a small memory footprint, thus demanding less bandwidth for updates. In August 2008, this distribution was registered as a project in launchpad web site.

In June 2008, Patrick Gundlach wrote the first post in ConTeXt blog.

In July 2009, ConTeXt started git repository.

In November 2010, the ConTeXt Group was created.

In April 2019, LMTX (ConTeXt LuaMetaTeX) was announced.

Example of code
Making ConTeXt documents is simple: one makes a plain text file, and compiles it with the context script. The result of this process is a PDF file (ConTeXt also can generate a DVI file). An example is shown below.

ConTeXt documents come with the file extension .tex or an extension demarking the version required: .mkii, .mkiv, or .mkxl for regular TeX, .mkvi or .mklx for a dialect that supports named macro parameters in addition to TeX’s numeric ones.

See also 

 List of TeX extensions
 LaTeX
 TeX

References

External links

Official pages 
  (distributes ConTeXt).
  (official).
  (official).
  (official).
 , new ConTeXt documentation .
 .

Manuals and tutorials 
  (official).
  (official).
 
 .
 .
 .
  and : introductory material of ConTeXt features.
 .
  (includes the official manual).
 .

Comparison between ConTeXt and LaTeX 
  for migration from LaTeX to ConTeXt.
 .  Note: this text is quite old, and the legal information it contains is not relevant today, since ConTeXt is under GPLv2.
 . Interview of Hans Hagen including an insight into what motivated the creation of ConTeXt.
 .
 .
 .  Originally  .  Contains a comparison of ConTeXt math capabilities with various latex math features, overall math alignments (gather, split, etc.).

Free TeX software
Page description languages